Zhang is the third most common surname in China and Taiwan (commonly spelled as "Chang" in Taiwan), and it is one of the most common surnames in the world. It is spoken in the first tone: Zhāng. It is a surname that exists in many languages and cultures, corresponding to the surname 'Archer' in English for example. In the Wade-Giles system of romanization, it is romanized as "Chang", which is commonly used in Taiwan; "Cheung" is commonly used in Hong Kong as romanization.

It is also the pinyin romanization of the less-common surnames  (Zhāng), which is the 40th name on the Hundred Family Surnames poem. There is the even-less common  (Zhǎng).

 was listed 24th in the famous Song-era Hundred Family Surnames, contained in the verse 何呂施張 (He Lü Shi Zhang).

Today, it is one of the most common surnames in the world at over 100 million people worldwide.

 was listed by the People's Republic of China's National Citizen ID Information System as the third-most-common surname in mainland China in April 2007, with 87.50 million bearers.

A commonly cited but erroneous factoid in the 1990 Guinness Book of Records listed it as the world's most common surname, but no comprehensive information from China was available at the time and more recent editions have not repeated the claim.

Romanization
 is also sometimes romanized as:

 Chang in Taiwan and among the Chinese diaspora using older romanization systems. However, Zhang has been the official first-recommended translation for 張 in Taiwan since 2017.
 Cheung in Cantonese; Cheong in Macao and Malaysia; 
 Teo and Teoh in Hokkien and Teochew; 
 Chong and Cheong in Hakka; 
 Tsan and Tsaon among Wu Chinese varieties like Shanghainese; 
 Cheong in Gan; and Tiong in Eastern Min and the Philippines; and 
 Tjong, Sutiono or Tiono in Indonesia.

 is the Hanja of the Korean surname romanized Jang and Chang.

 remains the Kanji for the Japanese surname romanized Chō.

 is also the Chữ Nôm form of the Vietnamese surname Trương.

Distribution
As mentioned above,  is the third-most-common surname in mainland China, making up 6.83% of the population of the People's Republic of China. In 2019 it was the most common surname in exactly one provincial-level division, Shanghai municipality. In Taiwan,  is the fourth-most-common surname, making up 5.26% of the population of the Republic of ChinaIn 2019 it was again the third most common surname in Mainland China.

Zhang Wei (张伟) has been the most common family name and given name combination in China for many years.

Among the Chinese diaspora, the name remains common but takes on various romanizations. "Chong" is the 19th-most-common surname among Chinese Singaporeans; "Chang" is the 6th-most-common surname among Chinese Americans; and "Zhang" was the 7th-most-common particularly Chinese surname found in a 2010 survey of Ontario's Registered Persons Database of Canadian health card recipients.

History

Characters
, cháng, "long" or "wide"). It originally meant "to open up" or "to spread" as an arching bow, but as a common noun in modern use it is a measure word for flat objects such as paper and cloth, like the English "sheet of".

Families
The traditional origin of the surname  (Old Chinese: *C. traŋ) is rooted in Chinese legend. The fifth son of the Yellow Emperor, Qing Yangshi (Qīng Yángshì), had a son Hui (Huī) who was inspired by the Heavenly Bow constellation (Tiān Gōng Xīng) to invent the bow and arrow. Hui was then promoted to "First Bow" (Gōng Zhèng) and bestowed the surname , whichwhen broken into its constituent radicalsmeans "widening bow" or "archer". Its Middle Chinese pronunciation has been reconstructed as Trjang.

Other origins
 for some families, it is traced back to Xie Zhang (解張), whose style name was Zhang Hou (張侯, lit “Marquis Zhang”) a noble in Jin during the Spring and Autumn period.
 from the family of Zhang Liao (張遼), an official in Cao Wei during Three Kingdoms period. Zhāng Liao's family had changed from Nie to Zhang to avoid association with his disgraced ancestor Nie Yi (聶壹).
 the surname is also traced back to Long Youna, chief of a minority ethnic grous during the Three Kingdoms period, who was given the Chinese surname Zhang (張) by Zhuge Liang, the prime minister of Shu.

See also
 Chinese name
 Chinese surname
 List of common Chinese surnames
 Trương, Zhang in Vietnamese

References

Chinese-language surnames
Individual Chinese surnames